This list of the tallest buildings and structures in the Birmingham Metropolitan Area, West Midlands ranks buildings and free-standing structures by height, based on standard height measurements that include spires and architectural details but exclude extraneous elements added after completion of the building.

The tallest building in the metropolitan area is The Mercian, a  residential tower located in Birmingham's Westside district. The tallest structure, also in Birmingham, is the 140-metre (458 ft) BT Tower. Both are set to be surpassed by Octagon, a  skyscraper currently under construction in Birmingham City Centre.

Birmingham Metropolitan Area 

The Birmingham metropolitan area is an urban agglomeration located in the West Midlands region of England with a population of around 4.3 million people, making it the second largest metropolitan area in the United Kingdom. It comprises the three cities (Birmingham, Coventry, Wolverhampton) and four metropolitan boroughs (Dudley, Sandwell, Solihull, Walsall) which make up the Metropolitan county of the West Midlands, along with its commuter zones, which extend into the neighbouring district authorities of Bromsgrove and Redditch in Worcestershire; Cannock Chase, Lichfield, South Staffordshire and Tamworth in Staffordshire; and all five district authorities of Warwickshire, including the towns of Bedworth, Coleshill, Nuneaton, Royal Leamington Spa, and Warwick itself. Each of these authorities has at least one high-rise, or tall building or structure ≥35 metres in height.

A number of sizeable settlements fall outside the morphological boundaries of the Birmingham Metropolitan Area but still form part of its economic and infrastructural hinterland. Amongst these, the cathedral city of Lichfield, the towns of Cannock, Hednesford and Rugeley in Staffordshire, Rugby and Stratford-upon-Avon in Warwickshire, and Kidderminster in the Wyre Forest District of Worcestershire. For completeness, the tall buildings and structures in these places are included in the listings below but, for accuracy, are not designated a metropolitan area ranking.

Like other regional conurbations in the United Kingdom, the Birmingham Metropolitan Area is polycentric, with several primary urban areas and satellite towns overlaying traditional market towns and civil parishes, separated by areas of protected green space. This is reflected in a diverse urban landscape characterised by examples of Medieval, Tudor, Jacobean, English Baroque, Georgian, Victorian, Edwardian, Modern, Postmodern and Contemporary architecture. Each of these architectural periods is represented by at least one tall building or structure.

All of the listings on this page are colour coded according to the authority in which they are located, based on the map of the Birmingham Metropolitan Area. The map can be used to find the authority for each entry and, where the building or structure is not located in a city centre, its district, town or parish.

City of Birmingham 

Birmingham has more than 375 tall buildings within its city boundaries, making it the most built-up city in the United Kingdom outside of London. It is home to the majority of the tallest buildings and structures in the West Midlands region.

The city currently has eight structures completed at a height of 100 metres or more and a further four
under construction, with ten of these being habitable. This is the third highest number of completed or under construction tall buildings or structures (≥100m) of any city in the United Kingdom.

History

The first structure to reach a height of 100 metres was the Joseph Chamberlain Memorial Clock Tower, constructed in 1908 and located in the Edgbaston area of the city. It remains the tallest free-standing clock tower in the world.

High-rise construction in Birmingham did not begin until the post war redevelopment of the 1960s and 1970s, when more than 25 commercial buildings taller than 50 metres were erected within the city centre and westwards along Broad Street to Five Ways and Hagley Road. Two further structures over 100 metres were built during this period – the 152-metre BT Tower, which remains the tallest structure in Birmingham, albeit at a reduced height, and the 100-metre, Grade II listed Alpha Tower. Other notable high-rise office buildings included Quayside Tower and Metropolitan House, both designed by John Madin and since refurbished. This era also saw more than 150 residential tower blocks of between 12 and 32 storeys built in clusters around the periphery of the city centre and throughout its suburbs. The majority of these Brutalist buildings were of limited architectural merit and have since been demolished, although some examples remain.

High-rise development slowed during the 1980s and 1990s, with few significant proposals emerging, but the turn of the 21st century saw a renewed interest in constructing tall buildings in central Birmingham. Completed in 2006, the 122-metre 10 Holloway Circus became the tallest habitable building in the city, while the Brindleyplace canalside development yielded a cluster of high-rise office buildings adjacent to the International Convention Centre and Birmingham Indoor Arena.

However, in the wake of the September 11 attacks, regulations imposed by the Civil Aviation Authority (CAA) and Birmingham City Council’s own ‘High Places’ planning policy framework restricted new buildings to a maximum height of around 120 metres, stymieing a number of appreciably taller proposals. These included the 245-metre Arena Central Tower, which at the time was set to become the tallest skyscraper in the United Kingdom. A number of subsequent proposals, including revised plans for a 152-metre V-shaped building at Arena Central, the 201-metre Regal Tower, and the 130-metre twin towers proposed for the New Street Station Gateway Plus project, succumbed to the global financial crisis and were either scaled back or scrapped.

Consequently, Birmingham’s most iconic 21st century buildings, including the Selfridges Building, Grand Central Station and the Library of Birmingham, are under 100 metres tall.

Present and future developments

In recent years the City Council has sought to encourage large-scale development, and a raft of tall buildings have been approved for construction across the City Core and all six of Birmingham’s City Centre Quarters – Eastside, Digbeth, Westside and Ladywood, Southside and Highgate, the Jewellery Quarter and St George and St Chad. These developments include the first three skyscrapers in Birmingham and will form a number of tall clusters across the city centre.

Already home to some of Birmingham's tallest buildings, the City Core will see several tall developments in the coming years, including the 155-metre Octagon tower at the Paradise redevelopment site in the city's Civic Heart, which is currently under construction. When completed, Octagon will become the world's tallest octagonally-shaped residential building. Octagon will be near neighbour to the newly completed 103 Colmore Row (108 metres), which is the tallest dedicated office building to be constructed outside of London since Alpha Tower was completed in 1973. To the east of the Historic Colmore Business District, Birmingham's Retail Core is set to be reshaped by Hammerson’s mixed-use Martineau Galleries scheme, incorporating a third building in excess of 100 metres in height.

In Westside and Ladywood, Moda Living’s 132-metre Mercian residential tower was completed in 2022 and became the tallest habitable building in Birmingham. It could be surpassed by the 145-metre Essington residential skyscraper which, if built, would become the tallest building in the Broad Street cluster. Other significant residential schemes around Broad Street and Brindleyplace include 111-metre Cortland Broad Street, 102-metre Bank Tower II and the proposed 100 Broad Street (c.100m), while Axis (100 metres) will extend the densification of commercial buildings around Centenary Square.

The Eastside district will become home to One Eastside, a 155-metre residential skyscraper which is due for completion in 2024 and will form part of the gateway to Birmingham’s new HS2 railway station at Curzon Street. This tower will be joined by two more approved residential towers – the 124-metre tower at Glasswater Locks and 111-metre Exchange Square tower, which is currently under construction. Extending outwards from Birmingham's Knowledge Quarter, the £360m Curzon Wharf masterplan, intended to be the world's first net zero carbon mixed-use development, includes proposals for two more tall buildings, one being a skyscraper rising to 172 metres.

To the South East of the City Core, swathes of Digbeth are scheduled to be redeveloped, with towers including the 146-metre Tower Leaf, 113-metre Boerma Tower and 102-metre Upper Trinity Street Tower already approved. A 32-storey mixed-use tower is planned to anchor the vast Smithfield site, which will link Digbeth to the Southside and Highgate district, and another cluster of approved high-rises in and around the city's Gay Village and Chinese Quarter. For nearby Smallbrook Queensway, plans have been submitted for a series of three towers up to 180-metres in height, with up to seven more tall buildings expected to transform the area between here and Holloway Circus in the forthcoming years.

Meanwhile, to the north west of the City Core, Moda Living’s approved 126-metre residential tower on Great Charles Street will form a landmark gateway to St Paul’s Square and the Jewellery Quarter, while at the same time marking the beginning of a high-rise convergence with the Snow Hill Commercial District. Here, plans have been submitted for 2 Snowhill Plaza, a 48-storey residential-led tower which is set to become one of the largest Build to Rent (BTR) schemes in the country.

If all future approved, proposed and emergent projects come to fruition, Birmingham's skyline will comprise more than 500 tall buildings and structures, including eight skyscrapers above 150 metres and a further 21 habitable towers above 100 metres.

City of Coventry

City of Wolverhampton

Metropolitan Boroughs

Commuter districts

List: Tallest existing buildings and structures

≥100 metres
An equals sign (=) following a rank indicates the same height between two or more buildings. Buildings that have been demolished are not included.

Updated: January 2023

50–99 metres
An equals sign (=) following a rank indicates the same height between two or more buildings. Buildings that have been demolished are not included.

Updated January 2023

35–49 metres
An equals sign (=) following a rank indicates the same height between two or more buildings.

Updated January 2023

Other tall buildings and structures
The buildings are not ranked but are instead listed in alphabetical order by metropolitan or regional authority.

Currently updating

List: Tallest buildings and structures under construction

Updated January 2023

List: Tallest approved, proposed and emergent projects

Approved

Updated February 2023

Updated July 2022

Proposed

Updated December 2022

Emergent
Please note that the data for each structure may not be complete.

Updated November 2022

List: Unbuilt
This list ranks proposals for the construction of buildings and free-standing structures in Birmingham that were planned to rise at least , for which planning permission was rejected or which were otherwise withdrawn.

List: Demolished
This list ranks buildings and free-standing structures in the Birmingham Metropolitan Area that are undergoing demolition or have been demolished since the year 2000, having stood at least  in height.

List: Timeline of tallest buildings and structures 

This is a list of the tallest surviving buildings and free-standing structures in the Birmingham Metropolitan Area constructed during each of the UK's major architectural periods, listed in chronological order. Buildings are only included where their existing highest point was built during the period and in the architectural style stated.

Gallery

Birmingham

See also 
 List of tallest buildings in Europe
 List of tallest buildings in the United Kingdom
 List of tallest structures in the United Kingdom
 List of tallest buildings by United Kingdom settlement
List of tallest buildings and structures in the United Kingdom by usage
 List of tallest church buildings in the United Kingdom
 Architecture of Birmingham
 History of Birmingham
 History of Coventry

Notes 
A.The following Wikipedia entries are taken to define the terms "building" and "free-standing structure":

 Building: "...a structure with a roof and walls standing more or less permanently in one place". Examples include: residential buildings, offices, hotels, serviced apartments, student accommodations, public facilities (e.g. hospitals), leisure and entertainment facilities (e.g. shops, casinos, leisure centres, cinemas), educational establishments (e.g. university buildings, schools), civic buildings (e.g. town halls, libraries, prisons), places of worship (e.g. churches, mosques), transport hubs (e.g. airport buildings, railway stations), stadia, industrial facilities (e.g. factories, works), or any mix of these uses.
 
 Free-standing structure: "...any body or system of connected parts used to support a load that was not designed for continuous human occupancy." Examples include: bridges, castles, chimneys, ferris wheels, monuments, storage tanks, and most types of self-supporting towers (which form the subset "tower" below), but not guyed or self-supporting communication masts.

B.The following Wikipedia entries are taken to differentiate between two different types of towers:

 Tower (block): "...a tall building [...] used as a residential, office building, or other functions including hotel, retail, or with multiple purposes combined." Examples include: residential towers, office towers, hotel towers, student residential towers and mixed-use towers.

 Tower: "...a tall structure, taller than it is wide, often by a significant factor. Towers are distinguished from masts by their lack of guy-wires and are therefore, along with tall buildings, self-supporting structures. Towers are specifically distinguished from buildings in that they are built not to be habitable but to serve other functions using the height of the tower." Examples include: telecommunication towers, observation towers, water towers and cooling towers.

C.In the absence of a universally accepted standard for the term Skyscraper, the following definition is endorsed: A self-supporting structure that is at least 50 percent habitable and "must rise to a minimum height of 150 metres (492 feet)." (TheB1M)

D.There is no absolute definition of what constitutes a high-rise or a "tall" building, and the terms are often used interchangeably. However, the following definitions, drawn from reputable sources cited elsewhere on Wikipedia, are taken as the standard for this page:

 High-rise: "A multi-story structure between 35–100 metres (115–328 ft) tall, or a building of unknown height from 12–39 floors." (Emporis). According to this definition, a building ≥100m in height would not be classified as a high-rise but rather as a skyscraper. However, the definition of a skyscraper endorsed on this page is a building with a minimum height of 150 metres (492 feet). Therefore, all buildings standing ≥100m but not exceeding <150m in height are classified as habitable towers, per the definition of a Tower (block).

 Tall: "[A tall building can be] ...considered against one or more of the following categories: (i) Height Relative to Context "...distinctly taller than the urban norm"; (ii) Proportion "...buildings that are not particularly high, but are slender enough to give the appearance of a tall building; (iii) Embracing Technologies Relevant to Tall Buildings "...containing technologies which may be attributed as being a product of “tall”. If a building can be considered as subjectively relevant to one or more of the above categories, then it can be considered a tall building. [...] "...a building of 14 or more stories – or more than 50 meters (165 feet) in height – could typically be used as a threshold for a “tall building.” (Council on Tall Buildings and Urban Habitat). Therefore, to qualify for listing on this page, a "tall" building or structure must be one that is distinctly taller than its surroundings, or gives the impression of a tall building or structure within its immediate environment, or incorporates the technologies of a tall building or structure, or is, notwithstanding, taller than 50 metres. Notionally, this classification includes any building or structure taller than 35 metres which forms a distinct part of its skyline and is not otherwise classified as a high-rise, tower (block) or skyscraper.

E.In 2020, a refurbishment of the British Telecom Tower, which included removing older satellites and antennas that were no longer in use, reduced the overall height of the structure from 152-metres to 140-metres. The refurbishment was completed in May 2022.

F.Items in this list include selected high-rises, tall buildings and free-standing structures in the Birmingham Metropolitan Area, where the height of each is supported by an appropriate reference. For concision, the suburban tower blocks located across the region have been omitted from this section. A full list of these high-rise buildings, approximately one hundred in number, can be found at Emporis.

References

External links

 Skyscrapernews Birmingham Database
 Emporis Birmingham Database

Birmingham
Tall
Birmingham
Tallest